The occupation of the Falkland Islands and South Georgia and the South Sandwich Islands ( "Military Administration of the Malvinas, South Georgia and South Sandwich Islands") was the short-lived Argentine occupation of a group of British islands in the South Atlantic whose sovereignty has long been disputed by Argentina. Until their invasion on 2 April 1982 by the Argentine military junta, they had been governed by the United Kingdom since it re-established control over them in 1833.

The invasion and subsequent occupation signalled the start of the Falklands War, which resulted in the islands' returning to British control on 14 June 1982.

Background 

The Falkland Islands had been under British administration since January 1833, when the United Kingdom re-established sovereignty over the islands which, at that time, housed an Argentine settlement. Argentina has claimed the Falklands as part of its territory ever since.

The UK first claimed South Georgia and the South Sandwich Islands in 1843, and incorporated them as Falkland Islands Dependencies in 1908. The Argentine Fishing Company had an operation on South Georgia in the early 20th century, and Argentina had claimed sovereignty over South Georgia since 1927 and the South Sandwich Islands since 1938. In November 1976, Argentina landed and occupied the uninhabited island of Southern Thule in the South Sandwich group, which had been in a British possession since the 18th century.

Establishment 

In the early hours of 2 April 1982, in the wake of violent anti-government riots in Buenos Aires, the military junta, which ruled Argentina, launched an invasion of the Falkland Islands. Faced with overwhelming Argentine force, Rex Hunt (British Governor of the Islands) surrendered to Admiral Carlos Büsser (the Argentine amphibious force commander) at 9.15am. The next day, Argentina sent troops to capture and occupy South Georgia and the uninhabited South Sandwich Islands.

Argentina had claimed the islands were part of the then federal territory of Tierra del Fuego and South Atlantic islands. On 3 April 1982, the junta issued a decree which separated the islands from the jurisdiction of Tierra del Fuego and named Brigadier General Mario Menéndez as the 'Military Governor of the Malvinas, South Georgia and the South Sandwich Islands'.

74 days of occupation 

On the first day of the occupation, Governor Hunt and officials from the Foreign Office were removed from the islands by the Argentine forces and sent to Montevideo, Uruguay. Argentine troops took over control of the Falkland Islands Broadcasting Studio when Patrick Watts was live on air.Rodney Hutchings, a former school-teacher from Britain that had only recently settled in Teal Inlet with his wife and son, recalls the sudden influx of Stanley residents seeking refuge in the settlement:

Argentina used Spanish while on the islands, including the use of Puerto Argentino, the Argentine name for Port Stanley.  Vehicles were told to drive on the right, with painted arrows on the road indicating the direction of traffic. Street signs and traffic signs were changed accordingly, including the use of the metric system. The Argentinian captain Barry Melbourne Hussey, who was chosen for a position in the administration due to his knowledge and experience of English, asserted safety as a major concern, during discussions with the Falkland Islanders: "Which would you prefer, that our eighteen-year-old conscripts, with their big lorries, should try to drive on the left, or that you, with your little vehicles, change to the right?". However, outside Stanley, most roads were single track anyway and some islanders refused to observe the new rule and continued to drive on the left. Other acts of civil disobedience included Reg Silvey (lighthouse keeper and ham radio enthusiast) broadcasting clandestine radio messages throughout the occupation.

The restrictions imposed by the military government became steadily worse – identification papers, curfews, compulsory blackouts, confiscation of radios and cameras, requisitioning of Land-Rover 4x4 vehicles and soldiers breaking into abandoned houses to steal furniture to use as firewood. Throughout the occupation, Phil Middleton and Steve Whitley would visit the abandoned houses to make sure they were not being vandalized but would also use these inspections as a cover to photograph Argentine positions.  

According to Port Stanley resident John Pole Evans, Argentine Air Force Pucarás conducted napalm bombings on 21 April near Stanley as a show of force that coincided with General Cristino Nicolaides's visit as commander of the Argentine Army's 1st Corps that included the 10th Infantry dug around the Falklands capital: "We knew what sort of damage they could do, because during April whilst we were still in our homes, they'd bombed the Tussac Island in the harbour with napalm and it burned for a couple of days. This was like a warning of what they were capable of—that they could destroy the settlement if they wanted to. For them it was probably just some sort of target practice."

Residents considered critical of the Argentines were expelled from the islands. This included Bill Luxton whose family had been resident in the Falklands since the 1840s and the editor of the Falkland Islands Times David Colville.

On 1 May, a Royal Air Force Vulcan bomber from Ascension Island attacked the airbase at Port Stanley before dawn. Royal Navy Sea Harriers attacked Port Stanley and Goose Green airbases at dawn. The bombing led to the Argentines authorities and local civilians  organising civil defence in the Falklands capital and several robust houses were designated Defensa Aerea Pasiva (Air Raid Shelters).

During the occupation, 114 inhabitants of Goose Green were imprisoned in the social hall until released by the British following the Battle of Goose Green. Lieutenant-Colonel Ítalo Piaggi, the Commanding Officer of the Argentine 12th Infantry Regiment, claimed that the lockdown in Goose Green was to protect the locals from attack by enraged Argentine Air Force personnel following the 1 May Sea Harrier strike.

According to local farm manager Eric Goss: 

According to Brook Hardcastle, the general manager of the Falkland Island Company (FIC) based at Goose Green:

On 4 May the British destroyer HMS Sheffield was hit by air-launched Exocet missile south-east of Falklands and a Sea Harrier was shot down over Goose Green. Eric Goss remembers the shocking news that day and having to intervene to save a local from potential harm:

On 6 May, Major Alberto Frontera (second-in-command 12th Regiment) in the presence of the civil affairs officer Captain Arnaldo Sanchez and the Regimental Medical Officer, Senior Lieutenant Juan Carlos Adjigogovich, visited the social hall to ensure the confined senior citizens (Mr and Mrs Anderson and Mr and Mrs Fynleyson) were managing under the circumstances.The Regimental Medical Officer along with an air force medical officer, First Lieutenant Fernando Miranda-Abós would regularly visit the social hall with Adjigogovich reporting, "We set up the clinic in one of the local houses. We tried to have a good relationship with them but they looked at us with suspicion. There was a daily medical review and every time they needed a doctor they were attended. I don't know how they managed before we arrived, because they called us quite often, practically every day, for whatever reason."The medical officer in the book Partes de Guerra (Graciela Speranza, Fernando Cittadini, p. 42, Editorial Norma, 1997) also describes how the infrastructures of Goose Geen broke under the strain of accommodating nearly 1,000 soldiers and local civilians and the British air attacks and naval bombardments that followed.

On 21 May, the Argentine command in Port Stanley sent out a civil affairs team, under Colonel Horacio Chimeno and Captain Esteban Eduardo Ralloto discuss the safety of civilians and to build shelters. Eric Goss again: "I told them to begin this process they should let the civilians go to their homes. I explained that all the eggs were effectively in one basket and that if we were to spread around the settlement then, if the worst happened, some of us would have a chance of survival. In the following days a number of civilians - my family included - were able to move back home."During the meeting with Vicecomodoro Wilson Rosier Pedrozo in attendance, it was agreed that air force personnel, that were largely inactive after the Pucara ground-attack aircraft had been withdrawn elsewhere, should form a military police unit to protect the local houses from vandalism after complaints had reached Monsignor Daniel Spraggon in the Falklands capital that the soldiers had started to smash furniture in order to apparently keep warm at night. 

According to David Colville from Port Stanley, the Argentine military expelled 52 schoolchildren from the Falklands capital and turned the playground of the school into a compound for drilling troops. The Argentine Air Force took over the Stanley Schoolhouse Building with one room serving as the Centro de Información y Control (Command & Control Centre) under Comodoro (Wing-Commander) Alberto Américo Catalá and another becoming the joints headquarters of the air force, army and marine anti-aircraft batteries. The Argentine peso replaced the Falkland Islands pound and stamps were overfranked with an Islas Malvinas postcode. Bill Etheridge was the Postmaster and continued to operate with his staff under the supervision of Everto Hugo Caballero of the La Empresa Nacional de Correos y Telégrafos (ENCOTEL, National Post Office & Telecommunications Company). Caballeros was no fan of the military junta, did not approve of the occupation and respected his new colleague Bill. "When all this is over," he told the Islander, "you must come and visit me and we'll have happier times." The Postmaster recalls:

Treatment of islanders

The Argentine military police arrived on the islands with detailed files on many islanders. One of their first actions was to arrest and deport noted critics of links to Argentina including David Colville, as well as Bill Luxton and his family.  Such deportations proved internationally embarrassing, as Bill Luxton gave numerous interviews on his deportation, and subsequently detainees were imprisoned at Fox Bay.

Major Patricio Dowling, an Argentine of Irish origin, became the chief of police.  He frequently overstepped his authority, ignoring instructions to treat the islanders with respect, and quickly became known throughout the islands for his tendency to resort to violence.  Dowling imposed a regime of arbitrary house searches, arrests and questioning.  His actions came to the attention of Comodoro Carlos Bloomer-Reeve who recommended to Brigadier-General Menéndez that he be removed and he was subsequently sent back to the mainland in disgrace.

According to police sergeant Anton Livermore: 

Major Roberto Eduardo Berazay, the officer commanding the 181st Military Police Company, would claim that his unit would win the trust of the Port Stanley residents fleeing to the countryside: "In order to prevent break-in-and-enter crimes, the local residents would repeatedly go to the Police Station to request that personnel from 181 MP Coy enter and occupy their homes during their period of absence, for which they would hand over the keys to their properties, which shows the level of trust won among the local population.

Captain Miguel Ángel Romano, a reservist, had been sent to Port Stanley to help take charge of the 181st Military Police Company during the Argentine occupation. According to local resident Patrick Watts: "He took appropriate action against conscripts caught stealing from unoccupied dwellings and tried to help the civilian community as far as his rank would allow."

Les Harris, a Port Stanley resident, describes a typical incident involving two conscripts that had broken into his property: 

Susan Betts from Pebble Island Settlement recalls the plight of the conscripts and life under armed guard while confined with the rest of the local civilians in the farm manager's house following the Special Air Service raid in the nearby airfield on the night of 14/15 May:

Comodoro Carlos Bloomer-Reeve, chief of the Secretariat of the new occupation forces, in conjunction with Navy Captain Barry Melbourne Hussey and Monsignor Daniel Spraggon were instrumental in avoiding conflict with the Argentine military.  Bloomer-Reeve had previously lived on the islands between 1975 and 1976, when he ran the LADE operation in Stanley and had great affection for the islanders.Jim Fairfield recalls his first encounter with Bloomer-Reeve after he and other Port Stanley residents went to see him in order to obtain monetary compensation for damages and missing items in their homes: 

Under Bloomer-Reeve's influence, warning signs soon appeared at the entance of all abandoned civilian houses that warned unauthorized personnel to not enter or face the full-wrath of military law.In an interview with Michael Bilton and Peter Kosminsky for their documentary The Falklands War: The Untold Story (1987), retired Brigadier-General Mario Benjamin Menéndez would tell both British journalists, "There was intense patrolling by our military police and a very strict discipline to ensure that soldiers could not move individually around Puerto Argentino. There were courts martial that sentenced officers and soldiers who  had violated these norms. Compensation was paid for anything lost or stolen. I remember that we even paid compensation for a cat which was run over by a military truck. The houses , jeeps and tractors that we used were not requisitioned , they were rented."

Official posters also appeared in the main buildings of Port Stanley, ordering the soldiers to keep the Falklands clean with the slogan MALIMA – short for Mantenga Limpia Malvinas and a bin illustration with Ron Buckett the head of transport, soon drawing over a poster a dimunitive local with customary woollen hat and wellington boots with a stump of a cigarette hanging out of his mouth, kicking an Argentine soldier towards a Royal Marine who in turn kicks the soldier into the bin. Buckett would make several photocopies of the altered poster and have them placed all over the Falklands capital. 

Doctor Alison Bleaney, with her husband Michael as works manager for the Falkland Islands Company, were kept busy throughout the occupation, with little rest. She was involved in arranging the Argentine surrender on 14 June and discovered that her baby was of great help in getting past the sentries guarding Government House. "I found that I could negotiate with angry Argie soldiers much more effectively when breastfeeding Emma! I always took her with me in a sling on my front when I wished to speak with senior officials, as the sentries' guns would be lowered when they spotted her".

There was no widespread abuse of the population. After the war it was found that even the islanders' personal food supplies and stocks of alcohol were untouched, and Brigadier-General Menéndez, the Argentine governor of the Islands, had made it clear from the start that he would not engage in any combat in Stanley itself. However, in the last day of battle, Private Santiago Carrizo of the 3rd Regiment described how a platoon commander ordered them to take up positions in the houses and "if a Kelper resists, shoot him", though the entire company did nothing of the kind.

There was also no wholesale confiscation of private property during the occupation, but had the islanders refused to sell, the goods in question would have been taken anyway. However, Argentine officers did steal civilian property at Goose Green following the detention of the civilian population, although they severely punished any conscripts that did the same.

Liberation 

On 22 April, the British task force arrived in Falklands waters; three days later British troops recaptured South Georgia. Following over a month of fierce naval and air battles, the British landed on 21 May, and a land campaign followed until Governor Mario Menéndez  surrendered to Major General Jeremy Moore on 14 June in Stanley.

On 28 May Darwin and Goose Green were liberated, and the attacking 2nd Battalion The Parachute Regiment (2 PARA) forced the surrender of some 1,000 of the Argentine defenders and released the local inhabitants unharmed. Robert Fox, a BBC correspondent with 2 PARA, reported: 

By the time they surrendered, the Argentine soldiers were already suffering from malnutrition, exposure, trench foot and diarrhea, brought on by lack of proper food and clean water.During the Battle of Goose Green, a number of houses were hit by small-arms fire or shrapnel. In the documentary The Islanders War (Mike Ford, 2007) Andrea Clausen recalls as a child having to hide under floorboards in the social hall during the terrifying softening-up bombardment on the part of the Royal Navy that took place during nine nights in a row.Argentine air force medical officer, First Lieutenant Fernando Miranda-Abós would be invited to join Surgeon-Commander Rick Jolly's “red and green life machine” medical hospital at San Carlos and would help save several Argentine and British lives with him recalling in a British documentary (Falklands Combat Medics, Richard Hawley,  History Channel, 2012), "Doctor Rick asked me if I wanted to work with them. I thought it was a good idea because somebody injured has no nationality. I mean, after being introduced we worked as a team, on good terms".
 
45 Commando liberated Douglas Settlement and 3 PARA liberated Teal Inlet before then end of May. Rodney Hutchings again:

On the night of 8-9 June, a number of soldiers from the 7th Regiment's A Company deserted their positions on Wireless Ridge and after crossing a river broke into the house of Claude and Judy Molkenbuhr in Murrell Farm and completely vandalized the house along with valuables. The four conscripts involved, Privates Carlos Alberto Hornos, Pedro Vojkovic, Alejandro Vargas and Manuel Zelarayán were killed when their heavily laden wooden boat struck an anti-tank mine on the opposite bank.

At around 1100 local time on 14 June the fighting for Port Stanley suddenly ended with Patrick Watts recalling: 

It was in deserted sheds, bungalows and even Stanley Racecourse where the British units sought shelter with Captain John Burgess recalling the exhausted state of 3 PARA: 

Local fireman Lewis Clifton describes how the infrastructures of Port Stanley broke under the strain of accommodating and processing thousands of cold, weary, hungry British soldiers and Argentine prisoners of war: "The place just couldn't take it. There was only sporadic electricity and water and the sanitation system collapsed. The streets were ankle-deep in human waste. The stench was awful, really awful, and we were all suffering from what we called Galtieri's revenge. He lost the war but left us ill."

Water was scarce, since Port Stanley's main pumping station had been damaged by British naval gunfire during the final battles, with many Argentine soldiers suffering from diarrhea because of Liver Fluke Disease (found in sheep and contaminated water), forced to relieve themselves in bathtubs in commandeered homes, public showers, the dockyard, and even the desk drawers of Stanley Post Office in the face of sudden violent bowel movement and with toilets no longer working.

On the night of 16 June, with not enough British guarding Argentinian POWs, a riot broke out which ended with the disgruntled Argentinians setting fire to the Globe Store. However a company from 2 PARA rushed to the area and order was restored. The Port Stanley fire brigade was assisted by an Argentinian fire-fighting team provided by Captain Miguel Ángel Romano (second-in-command of the 181st Military Police Company) who prevented the fires from spreading across the town.

Claims that the Argentine soldiers had behaved like savages throughout the occupation were investigated with British war correspondents Patrick Joseph Bishop and John Witherow writing:Richard Savill of the Press Association would report that many houses had been broken into, "The soldiers looted many houses, apparently looking for food"Captain Roger Field from the Blues & Royals recalls, "We are warned about booby-traps. The wankers have left them for us. I hear someone rigged an abandoned Panhard to blow. What fun if an inquisitive kid had crawled in take a look instead of a cautious Para. I also read of a rigged hand grenade left in the school – true or false, I have no idea, but we are coming to believe it of them."

Struggling to supply their own units, the British commanders were overwhelmed by the number of prisoners of war, who patiently handed over their weapons and then awaited repatriation. Said a worried Rear-Admiral John Woodward: "They are already suffering from malnutrition, exposure, trench foot, scabies and diarrhea, brought on by lack of food and pure water, proper clothing, shelter and sanitation. Even feeding them for a week presents huge problems."

On 17 June, British military police from 160 Provost Company began searching the prisoners of war for concealed weapons prior to embarking them on the British liner Canberra and Norland ferry that would  take them back to Argentina. The first prisoners of war to board the ships were the officers and men from the 3rd Infantry Regiment of the 10th Brigade who were told to dump all their gear, packs, sleeping bags, ponchos and food items on the street leading them to dockyard, much to the fury of the brigade commander, Brigadier-General Oscar Luis Jofre, "At the beginning of the march, the unfortunate scene took place of Argentine equipment being dumped all along the street that led to the dock, a route that had been crossed by the already mentioned 3rd Mech Inf Rgt. Once again there had been a change in the agreed plans, ordering that the troops embark only with what they were wearing, since they would be provided with all that they needed on board. Consequently, the shoulder bags, food packs and other items of equipment had to be dumped on the street, a fact that created a truly deplorable situation. These scenes were filmed by cameramen, creating the image of great disorder on our part, when the opposite was the truth.
 
Independent Television News reporter Michael Nicholson and his team captured all this and the vandalized Post Office on film with the British reporter commenting:

 
On 18 June the International Red Cross reported that it had obtained guarantees of safe conduct for Canberra and Norland, unarmed and unescorted, to disembark the prisoners of war in Argentine ports, and for Argentine hospital ships to repatriate the sick and wounded. A platoon from the 10th Engineers Company remained behind for another month to help clear the extensive minefields.
 
On 20 June, British forces landed on the South Sandwich Islands and Southern Thule where 10 Argentines handed over their station. 649 Argentines, 255 Britons and 3 Falkland Islanders died during the war.

On 19 July, the 1st Battalion Queen's Own Highlanders arrived in Port Stanley aboard the Norland to take over garrison duties, with The New York Times reporting that day that Captain Brian Lloyd from the Royal Engineers had found a hand-grenade wedged under the floorboards of the Stanley School Building that in the opinion of the British officer was clearly aimed at causing casualties among the new troops.Captain Lloyd also reported finding booby-traps inside wool and peat sacks in the warehouses and Stanley Racecourse that the remnants of the 7th Regiment and reinforcements from the 3rd (C Company) and 25th Regiment (B Company) had used as their last defence line or rallying points on the morning of 14 June.

Dissolution 

The Argentine Administration officially continued to exist until 15 May 1985 when it was dissolved by President Raúl Alfonsín. Since then, Argentina has claimed the islands are part of Tierra del Fuego (then an Argentine National Territory) which became a fully-fledged province of Argentina in 1990.

See also 
Falkland Islands sovereignty dispute
South Georgia and South Sandwich Islands sovereignty dispute

Notes

References

Bibliography 

States and territories established in 1982
States and territories disestablished in 1982
1982 in Argentina
1982 in military history
1982 in South America
1982 in the Falkland Islands
Former political divisions related to Argentina
Falkland